Duncan Smith (19 January 1929 – 28 August 2001) was a Scottish footballer who played in the 1950s.  He began his professional career with Dumbarton, where he spent two seasons.  During this spell he was selected to play for a Scottish B League XI against an Irish B League XI, where he scored a goal in the 6–0 win.  Thereafter he played with Clyde, Arbroath and Albion Rovers. Following his football career, Duncan lived and worked as a machine tools operator in East Kilbride where he died after a short illness surrounded by his family.

References

1929 births
2001 deaths
Scottish footballers
Dumbarton F.C. players
Clyde F.C. players
Arbroath F.C. players
Albion Rovers F.C. players
Scottish Football League players
Association football inside forwards